Invisible Stars is the eighth studio album of original material by alternative rock band Everclear. The album was released June 26, 2012 through eOne Music, and marked their first release of original material in six years, following 2006's Welcome to the Drama Club. The album's only single, "Be Careful What You Ask For", was released on May 15, 2012, with an accompanying music video in the following month. The album debuted at #119 on the Billboard 200.

Track listing

Personnel
 Art Alexakis – lead vocals, rhythm guitar, keyboards
 Dave French – lead guitar, backing vocals
 Freddy Herrera – bass, backing vocals
 Sean Winchester – drums, percussion, keyboards, backing vocals
 Josh Crawley – keyboards
 Sasha Smith – keyboards
 Nathaniel Kunkel, Stuart Schenk, Erik Reichers, Mark McCluskey – recording engineers
 Marc McClusky, Bob Horn – mixing
 Brad Blackwood – mastering
 Tiana Godfrey, Rob Simmons – photography
 Paul Grosso – art direction and design

References

2012 albums
Everclear (band) albums
E1 Music albums
Albums produced by Art Alexakis